Twixt is a 2011 horror film written, produced, and directed by Francis Ford Coppola and starring Val Kilmer, Bruce Dern, Elle Fanning, Ben Chaplin, Alden Ehrenreich, David Paymer and Joanne Whalley. The film premiered on September 4, 2011 at the Toronto International Film Festival and was screened at various film festivals in North America, receiving a limited theatrical release in a handful of international markets. The film's title, Twixt, refers to the two worlds explored in the film, the dream and the waking worlds.

Twixt was released on Blu-ray and DVD by Fox Home Entertainment on July 23, 2013, and the film marks the on-screen reunion of former spouses, Kilmer and Whalley.

Plot
The film follows Hall Baltimore (Val Kilmer), a down-on-his-luck writer who specializes in novels based upon witch hunting. At a book signing, he is approached by Sheriff Bobby LaGrange (Bruce Dern), an eccentric fan with two requests: that Hall read his latest work and that he also accompany him to the morgue to view the body of a recent murder victim, as Bobby believes that it would make for a great story. Hall reluctantly agrees, and at the morgue he learns that the person was murdered by a serial killer. Despite offers from Bobby, Hall opts to not look at the victim's face. At the coffee shop he learns about a local hotel that once sheltered Edgar Allan Poe. This, along with the murders and various other odd features of the town, prompt Hall to announce to his wife, Denise (Joanne Whalley), that he wants to write a piece based upon the town.

After falling asleep, Hall is shown wandering a dream-like version of the town, where he meets V (Elle Fanning), a young girl by the name of Virginia, who is nicknamed "Vampira" due to her strange teeth and braces. V tells Hall that she's a fan of his work but was unable to attend the signing due to the town's clock tower always giving seven different conflicting times. Hall attempts to persuade V to join him at the hotel for a soda, but she refuses to enter the lodging. Despite this, Hall enters the hotel and discovers that it is run by a strange and eccentric couple that talks about daylight saving time and the town's history of murder. V appears in the window, only for the female hotel owner to shoo her away. V bites her, which prompts Hall to run outside after V and find her threatening a priest by saying that he "knew what [he] did". Hall continues to follow V and runs into Edgar Allan Poe (Ben Chaplin), who guides him back to town.

The next morning Hall wakes and, inspired, decides that he would like to collaborate with Bobby on his proposed story, which would center around vampires. Bobby invites Hall to his home, which contains a miniature model of a machine that would drive a stake into a vampire's heart. Hall is informed that Bobby believes that the machine would be good in the story, which he wants to name The Vampire Executions. Despite Bobby's input, Hall finds himself faced with writer's block and accepts several sleeping pills from Bobby in hopes of finding further inspiration from his dreams. Hall succeeds in once again entering the dream version of the town, where he meets Poe again. A series of visions imply that V was molested by the town's priest, who takes in orphans out of fear of them joining Flamingo (Alden Ehrenreich), leader of the people across the lake, who are believed to be vampires. In the waking world Hall's world begins to unravel as several strange occurrences begin to mirror the experiences he had in the dream world, such as Bobby talking about how he believes that teenagers gathering at the town's lake are "evil" and "asking for it". This prompts Hall to look strangely at Bobby, who knocks Hall unconscious.

In the dream world Hall learns that the priest had drugged and murdered all the children in order to keep them from joining Flamingo at the lake. V managed to briefly survive, but was chased down and murdered by the priest. Ashamed of his actions, the priest hangs himself. Hall realizes that his writer's block is the result of a form of guilt over his daughter's death in a boating accident, as he had been too drunk to accompany her that morning. Working through his emotions, Hall writes a story where V survives the priest's assaults and is rescued by Flamingo. Hall wakes up in his room to find that Bobby has left. He goes to the sheriff's office, only to find that the deputy has been murdered and that Bobby has hanged himself, leaving a note that says "Guilty". Upset, Hall goes down to the morgue to look at the murder victim's face, only to discover that it is V's body and that she had been impaled with a stake. Hall removes the stake from her chest, at which point V awakens and attacks him with a new set of elongated fangs.

The screen then cuts to Hall's publisher, Sam Malkin (David Paymer), setting down a new manuscript and telling Baltimore that he loves the story (implying everything from the first dream sequence up to this point has been the manuscript itself) and sees a whole new series ahead for Baltimore that will make him more popular than ever. Post-film text reveals that the series was moderately popular, LaGrange's murder was never solved and that Flamingo was never seen or heard from again.

Cast
Val Kilmer as Hall Baltimore
Bruce Dern as Bobby LaGrange
Elle Fanning as Virginia "V"
Ben Chaplin as Edgar Allan Poe
Joanne Whalley as Denise
Don Novello as Melvin
David Paymer as Sam Malkin
Alden Ehrenreich as Flamingo
Lisa Biales as Ruth
Anthony Fusco as Pastor Allan Floyd
Ryan Simpkins as Carolyne
Lucas Rice Jordan as P. J.
Bruce A. Miroglio as Deputy Arbus
Tom Waits as the narrator
Dylan Cavaz as Orphan #2
Ryan Himenes as hardware store clerk

Production

Development

In an interview with The New York Times, Coppola discussed the origins of the film, which he said "grew out of dream [he] had last year – more of a nightmare" and "seemed to have the imagery of Hawthorne or Poe." He continued:

But as I was having it I realized perhaps it was a gift, as I could make it as a story, perhaps a scary film, I thought even as I was dreaming. But then some loud noise outside woke me up, and I wanted to go back to the dream and get an ending. But I couldn't fall back asleep so I recorded what I remembered right there and then on my phone. I realized that it was a gothic romance setting, so in fact I'd be able to do it all around my home base, rather than have to go to a distant country.

Filming and post-production
Twixt was filmed at Coppola's estate in Napa County as well as locations in Lake County, California, including the City of Clearlake, downtown Kelseyville and Nice.

Musician Dan Deacon scored the film. The film's name was changed from Twixt Now and Sunrise to Twixt, and scenes from it were played at the July 2011 San Diego Comic-Con International.

Release
Twixt was screened solely at film festivals in North America as it was a featured film at the November 2011 American Film Market. The film received a general theatrical release in a handful of international markets.

A re-edited and restored version titled B'Twixt Now and Sunrise was released theatrically on September 30, 2022, and on Blu-ray and digital on February 28, 2023.

Reception

Critical reception for Twixt has been predominantly negative. , the film holds a "rotten" rating of 29% on the review aggregator website Rotten Tomatoes, based upon 21 reviews, with an average rating of 4.5/10. Reviewers have criticized the film for being "flimsy" and "[close to] unwatchable". The Hollywood Reporter panned Coppola's dream sequences in Twixt, commenting that the "young Coppola" could have done more with the scenes while "the present-day [Coppola] produces only tepid and tired imagery that would not earn high marks in any film school."

In contrast, Le Monde, Variety and Les Cahiers du cinéma gave the film positive reviews, and Variety praised Twixt as a "disarmingly cheeky, intermittently gorgeous trifle". French film magazine Cahiers du cinéma placed it as the third best film of 2012.

References

External links

 
 

2011 films
2011 horror films
Films directed by Francis Ford Coppola
Films produced by Francis Ford Coppola
Films with screenplays by Francis Ford Coppola
Films shot in California
Cinema of the San Francisco Bay Area
American Zoetrope films
American horror films
2010s English-language films
2010s American films